Lord Augustus Henry Charles Hervey (2 August 1837 – 28 May 1875) was a British Conservative Party politician.

Background
Hervey was the second son of Frederick Hervey, 2nd Marquess of Bristol, and Lady Katherine Isabella, daughter of John Manners, 5th Duke of Rutland. Frederick Hervey, 3rd Marquess of Bristol and Lord Francis Hervey were his brothers.

Political career
Hervey was returned as a Member of Parliament (MP) for Suffolk West at a by-election in 1864, succeeding his elder brother Frederick, Earl Jermyn. He was returned again at the next three general elections, and held the seat until his death in 1875.

Family
Hervey married Mariana, daughter of William P. Hodnett and widow of Ashton Benyon, in 1861.  They first met at Isckworth while she was visiting, introduced by the Duke of Rutland. She was still only eighteen years old, and recently bereaved by the death of her first husband when they tied the knot.

They had five sons and two daughters. Two of his sons, Frederick and Herbert, both succeeded in the marquessate. His second daughter Maria married Sir Charles Welby, 5th Baronet.

Hervey died in May 1875, aged 37. Lady Augustus Hervey remained a widow until her death in January 1920.

References

External links 
 

1837 births
1875 deaths
Younger sons of marquesses
Conservative Party (UK) MPs for English constituencies
UK MPs 1859–1865
UK MPs 1865–1868
UK MPs 1868–1874
UK MPs 1874–1880
Augustus Hervey, Lord